Rockingham is a ward in the metropolitan borough of Barnsley, South Yorkshire, England.  The ward contains seven listed buildings that are recorded in the National Heritage List for England.  All the listed buildings are designated at Grade II, the lowest of the three grades, which is applied to "buildings of national importance and special interest".  The ward contains the village of Birdwell, part of the town of Hoyland, and the surrounding area.  The listed buildings consist of a farmhouse and farm buildings, some of which have been converted for residential use, a church, a milepost, a memorial obelisk, and a ruined prospect tower.


Buildings

References

Citations

Sources

 

Lists of listed buildings in South Yorkshire
Buildings and structures in the Metropolitan Borough of Barnsley